Loricariichthys melanocheilus is a species of catfish found in the lower Paraná River and Uruguay River basins in South America, where it is known from Argentina and Brazil. The species reaches 43 cm (16.9 inches) in standard length and is believed to be a facultative air-breather.

References

Further reading
Teixeira de Mello, F., et al. "Length–weight relationships of eight fish species from the lower section of the Uruguay River (Rio Negro, Uruguay)." Journal of Applied Ichthyology 25.1 (2009): 128–129.
Zardo, Éverton Luís, and Everton Rodolfo Behr. "Population structure and reproductive biology of Loricariichthys melanocheilus Reis & Pereira, 2000 (Siluriformes: Loricariidae) in the rio Ibicuí, Brazil." Neotropical IchthyologyAHEAD (2015): 00–00.
Teixeira‐de Mello, F., et al. "Length–weight relationships of 26 fish species from the middle section of the Negro River (Tacuarembó‐Durazno, Uruguay)."Journal of Applied Ichthyology 27.6 (2011): 1413–1415.

External links

FishBase

Loricariini
Fish of South America
Taxa named by Roberto Esser dos Reis
Taxa named by Edson H.L. Pereira
Fish described in 2000
Taxobox binomials not recognized by IUCN